Ellie or Elly is a given name and nickname. It may also refer to:


Arts and entertainment
 Ellie (film), a 1984 comedy
 Ellie, a 2001 studio album by Ellie Campbell
 "Ellie" (CSI), an episode of the American crime drama CSI
 "Ellie" (The West Wing), an episode of the American political drama The West Wing
 Ellie, a character in the 2013 video game The Last of Us

Places
 Elly, Virginia, United States, an unincorporated community
 616 Elly, an asteroid

People
 John Elly (1581–1639), a canon of Windsor
 Elly (dancer), Japanese dancer, rapper, and member of Sandaime J Soul Brothers
 LE (rapper), South Korean rapper, singer and songwriter Ahn Hyo-jin (born 1991), formerly known by the stage name "Elly"
 "Elly", a former stage name of Japanese pop singer Eriko Imai (born 1983)
 Elly, stage name of South Korean girl group Weki Meki member Jung Hae Rim (born 1998)

Other uses
 "Ellie", the "Elephant" statuette given to National Magazine Awards winners